Kim Jong-hun (born September 1, 1956) is a retired North Korean football player and the former head coach of the North Korea national football team. He led the nation's team to and during the 2010 FIFA World Cup.

Biography 
As a player, Kim Jong-hun has spent his career at April 25 Sports Club. He was capped four times for North Korea during the qualifications for the 1974 and 1986 FIFA World Cups.

After ending his player career, Kim became a manager. He managed April 25 Sports Team until 2007, when he became the manager of North Korea national team. In 2009, he led the team as it qualified for the 2010 FIFA World Cup, their first since 1966.

After a disappointing showing at the World Cup, Kim faced harsh criticism upon his return to North Korea. Radio Free Asia reported that he was publicly shamed and condemned for hours in front of 400 people, including the North Korean sports minister.

At the same event, the team members were commanded to individually criticize their coach, who was accused of betraying General Kim Jong-un, the country's heir apparent. The report also mentioned that he had been stripped of his membership in the Workers' Party of Korea and forced to work hard labor on a construction site as punishment. It is however unknown whether Kim was really faced with such a violating punishment, as far as DPRK has its information mostly closed from the other world. Little is known about Kim Jong-hun's current (by July 2022) occupation, probably due to the same reason.

References 

1956 births
Living people
North Korean football managers
North Korea national football team managers
2010 FIFA World Cup managers
April 25 Sports Club players
April 25 Sports Club managers
People's Athletes
North Korean footballers
Association football defenders
North Korea international footballers